Budišovice is a municipality and village in Opava District in the Moravian-Silesian Region of the Czech Republic. It has about 800 inhabitants.

History
The first written mention of Budišovice is from 1282.

Gallery

References

External links

Villages in Opava District